Supino is a comune (municipality) in the Province of Frosinone in the Italian region Lazio, located about  southeast of Rome and about  west of Frosinone.

Supino borders the following municipalities: Carpineto Romano, Ferentino, Frosinone, Giuliano di Roma, Gorga, Maenza, Morolo, Patrica.

References

Cities and towns in Lazio